Al McKibbon (January 1, 1919 – July 29, 2005) was an American jazz double bassist, known for his work in bop, hard bop, and Latin jazz.

In 1947, after working with Lucky Millinder, Tab Smith, J. C. Heard, and Coleman Hawkins, he replaced Ray Brown in Dizzy Gillespie's band, in which he played until 1950. In the 1950s he recorded with the Miles Davis nonet, Earl Hines, Count Basie, Johnny Hodges, Thelonious Monk, Mongo Santamaria, George Shearing, Cal Tjader, Herbie Nichols and Hawkins. McKibbon was credited with interesting Tjader in Latin music while he played in Shearing's group.

McKibbon has always been highly regarded (among other signs of this regard, he was the bassist for the Giants of Jazz), and continued to perform until 2004.

In 1999, the first album in his own name, Tumbao Para Los Congueros De Mi Vida, was released. McKibbon's second album, Black Orchid, was released in 2004 and was recorded at Icon Recording Studios, Hollywood, California. The album was Produced by Damon Martin, recorded by studio co-owner Andrew Troy and Assistant Engineer - Aaron Kaplan, 2nd Assistant Engineer - Pablo Solorzano. 'Black Orchid' was mixed by Robbie Adams.  Al also wrote the Afterword to Raul Fernandez' book, Latin Jazz, part of the Smithsonian Institution's series of exhibitions on jazz.

Discography

As leader
Tumbao Para Los Congueros De Mi Vida (Blue Lady, 1999)
Black Orchid (Departure Records, 2004)

As sideman
With Nat Adderley
To the Ivy League from Nat (1956)
With Lorez Alexandria
Alexandria the Great (Impulse!, 1964)
More of the Great Lorez Alexandria (Impulse!, 1964)
With Sonny Criss
Sonny's Dream (Birth of the New Cool) (Prestige, 1968) 
With Miles Davis
Birth of the Cool (Capitol, 1957)
With Victor Feldman
Latinsville! (Contemporary, 1960)

With Dizzy Gillespie
The Complete RCA Victor Recordings (Bluebird, 1937-1949, [1995])
Carter, Gillespie Inc. (Pablo, 1976) with Bennie Carter
With Coleman Hawkins 
The Coleman Hawkins, Roy Eldridge, Pete Brown, Jo Jones All Stars at Newport (Verve, 1957)
With Johnny Hodges
Castle Rock (Norgran, 1951 [1955])
With The Jazz Crusaders
Chile Con Soul (Pacific Jazz, 1965)
With Charles Kynard and Buddy Collette
Warm Winds (World Pacific, 1964)
With Thelonious Monk
Genius of Modern Music: Volume 2 (1955)
The Giants of Jazz (Atlantic) with Art Blakey, Dizzy Gillespie, Sonny Stitt and Kai Winding (1971)
The London Sessions (Black Lion) with Art Blakey (1971)
With Randy Newman
12 Songs (1970)
With The Night Blooming Jazzmen
The Night Blooming Jazzmen (1971)
With Herbie Nichols
The Prophetic Herbie Nichols Vol. 1 (1955)
The Prophetic Herbie Nichols Vol. 2 (1955)
Herbie Nichols Trio (1956)
With Shuggie Otis
"Here Comes Shuggie Otis" (1969)
With Freddie Redd
Live at the Studio Grill (Triloka, 1990)
With George Shearing
Latin Escapade (1956)
On the Sunny Side of the Strip (1960)
With George Shearing and Dakota Staton
In the Night (1958)
With Robert Stewart
The Movement (Exodus, 2002)
With Billy Taylor
Piano Panorama (Atlantic, 1952)
With Cal Tjader
Cal Tjader, Vibist (Savoy, 1954)
Cal Tjader Plays Afro-Cuban (Fantasy, 1955)
Ritmo Caliente! (Fantasy, 1956)
Tjader Plays Tjazz (Fantasy, 1956)
Mas Ritmo Caliente (Fantasy, 1957)
Latin for Lovers (Fantasy, 1958)
Cal Tjader's Latin Concert (Fantasy, 1958)
A Night at the Blackhawk (Fantasy, 1958)
Cal Tjader Goes Latin (Fantasy, 1959)
Cal Tjader's Concert by the Sea (Fantasy, 1959)
Cal Tjader's Concert by the Sea, Vol. 2 (Fantasy, 1959)
Demasiado Caliente (Fantasy, 1960)
Cal Tjader Plays Harold Arlen (Fantasy, 1960)
In a Latin Bag (Verve, 1961)
Live at the Monterey Jazz Festival 1958-1980 (Concord, 2008)
With Jack Wilson
The Jack Wilson Quartet featuring Roy Ayers (Atlantic, 1963)

References

 San Jose Mercury News report of death 30 July 2005
 Googled cache of Bassland article retrieved 18 June 2005
 https://web.archive.org/web/20050328093624/http://extratv.warnerbros.com/cmp/presentations/99_grammy/ retrieved Aug. 5, 2005
 Frenandez, Raul. Latin Jazz: The Perfect Combination/La Combinacion Perfecta (Chronicle Books, 2002).

Bebop double-bassists
Latin jazz double-bassists
Hard bop double-bassists
1919 births
2005 deaths
American jazz double-bassists
Male double-bassists
Cass Technical High School alumni
Mainstream Records artists
Miles Davis
20th-century double-bassists
American male jazz musicians
The Giants of Jazz members
20th-century American male musicians